Nugegoda Grama Niladhari Division is a Grama Niladhari Division of the Sri Jayawardanapura Kotte Divisional Secretariat of Colombo District of Western Province, Sri Lanka. It has Grama Niladhari Division Code 519.

St. Joseph's Boys' College, Nugegoda, Yachting Association of Sri Lanka, Samudradevi Balika Vidyalaya and Jubilee Post, Nugegoda are located within, nearby or associated with Nugegoda.

Nugegoda is a surrounded by the Dutugemunu, Kohuwala, Gangodavila North, Pagoda East, Nugegoda West and Pagoda Grama Niladhari Divisions.

Demographics

Ethnicity 

The Nugegoda Grama Niladhari Division has a Sinhalese majority (88.9%). In comparison, the Sri Jayawardanapura Kotte Divisional Secretariat (which contains the Nugegoda Grama Niladhari Division) has a Sinhalese majority (84.8%)

Religion 

The Nugegoda Grama Niladhari Division has a Buddhist majority (81.2%). In comparison, the Sri Jayawardanapura Kotte Divisional Secretariat (which contains the Nugegoda Grama Niladhari Division) has a Buddhist majority (77.1%)

Gallery

References 

Grama Niladhari Divisions of Kotte Divisional Secretariat